"One More River" is the second single from Australian rock musician James Reyne’s second studio album Hard Reyne released in (1989). It peaked at number 22 in Australia in August 1989.

Track listings
 Cassette Single/ 7”
 "One More River"	- 4:01
 "Jim Dandy”

 CD Single
 "One More River"	
 "Jim Dandy"	
 "Wake Up Deadman"

Charts

External links

References

1989 songs
1989 singles
Capitol Records singles
James Reyne songs
Songs written by James Reyne